Pietro Vesconte (fl. 1310–1330) was a Genoese cartographer and geographer. A pioneer of the field of the portolan chart, he influenced Italian and Catalan mapmaking throughout the fourteenth and fifteenth centuries. He appears to have been the first professional mapmaker to sign and date his works regularly.

Although Vesconte was born in Genoa, he produced much of his work in Venice. He was active between 1310 and 1330, producing numerous maps. His nautical charts are among the earliest to map the Mediterranean and Black Sea regions accurately. He also produced progressively more accurate depictions of the coastlines of northern Europe, in particular that of Britain and, to a lesser extent, Ireland.

Pietro Vesconte's 1311 portolan chart of the east Mediterranean is the oldest signed and dated nautical chart that survives from the medieval period. He is also the author of at least four signed multi-sheet atlases (1313, 1318a, 1318b, c. 1321), where the various sheets can be combined into a single nautical chart. There is also an atlas (1321) and a solitary portolan chart (1327) signed by "Perrino Vesconte", assumed to be either Pietro himself or possibly a younger relative member of his family using a diminutive form of 'Pietro'. The image of a mapmaker at work, which appears in a Vesconte atlas of 1318, may depict the chartmaker himself.

Pietro Vesconte brought his experience as a maker of portolans to bear on the mappa mundi (circular world map) he produced, which introduced a previously unheard of accuracy to the genre. He provided a world map, nautical atlas, a map of the Holy Land and plan of Acre and Jerusalem for inclusion in Marino Sanuto's Liber secretorum fidelium crucis, a work which aimed to encourage a new crusade.  There are three known copies of Sanuto's Liber (c. 1320–21, c. 1321, c. 1325) that include Vesconte's maps, only the first of which is signed; the latter two are confidently assumed to have been done by him, or at least under his direction.

Works by or attributed to Vesconte 

The following works have been signed or attributed to Pietro Vesconte.

 1311 dated & signed portolan chart of the east Mediterranean, held (C.N.1) by the Archivio di Stato in Florence, Italy.
 1313 dated & signed atlas of six sheets held (DD 687) by the Bibliotheque Nationale de France in Paris, France. (1. calendar, 2. Black Sea, 3. Aegean Sea, 4. east Mediterranean, 5. central Mediterranean, 6. west Mediterranean and British Isles)
 1318 dated & signed atlas of seven sheets held (Port. 28) by Museo Correr in Venice, Italy. (1 calendar, 2. Black Sea, 3. east Medit., 4. central Med., 5. west Med, 6. Spain and north Africa, 7. north Atlantic)
 1318 dated & signed atlas of ten sheets held (MS 594) by Österreichische Nationalbibliothek in Vienna, Austria. (1.calendar, 2. Black Sea, 3. east Medit., 4. central Medit. (south), 6. central Medit. (north) 7. west Medit., 8. Spain and French Atlantic coast, 9. British Isles, 10. Adriatic Sea)
 c.1320-21 undated but signed by Vesconte, for Marino Sanudo's Liber secretorum, mappa mundi plus atlas of five sheets (partially missing), held (Pal. Lat.1362A) by the Bibliotheca Apostolica in Vatican City (2. Black sea, 3. Aegean, 4. Palestine & east Medit. 5. Adriatic and North Africa, 6. west Medit and north Atlantic)
 1321 dated and signed Perrino Vesconte, atlas of five sheets held (R.P.4) by the Zentralbibliothek  in Zurich, Switzerland. (1 calendar, 2. Spain and north Atlantic, 3. central Medit., 4. east Medit. 5. Black Sea)

 c.1321 undated atlas of nine sheets held (MS 175) by the Bibliothèque municipale in Lyons, France. (1. calendar, 2. rhumb network, 3. Black Sea, 4. east Medit., 5. central Medit (north), 6. central Medit (north) 7. west Medit. 8. British Isles & France, 9. Adriatic Sea)
 c.1321 undated and unsigned, confidently attributed to Vesconte, for Marino Sanudo's Liber secretorum, mappa mundi and atlas of five sheets held (Vat. Lat. 2972) by the Bibliotheca Apostolica in Vatican City (1. Black Sea, 2. Aegean and north Africa, 3. Palestine & east Medit. 4. central medit,5. west Medit and north Atlantic)
 c.1325 undated and unsigned, confidently attributed to Vesconte, for Marino Sanudo's Liber secretorum, mappa mundi and atlas of five sheets, held (Add MS 27376) by the British Library, in London, UK. (1. Spain and north Atlantic, 2. central Medit., 3. Palestine & east Medit., 4. Aegean & north Africa, 5. Black Sea)
 1327 dated and signed Perrino Vesconte, portolan chart, held (Med Palat.248) by the Biblioteca Medicea Laurenziana in Florence, Italy.

References

 Cortesão, Armando (1969) ''History of Portuguese Cartography", Lisbon: Ultramar.

14th-century Italian cartographers
14th-century Genoese people